Thayetkon may refer to several places in Burma:

Thayetkon (24°38"N 95°40"E)-Banmauk Township, Sagaing Region
Thayetkon (24°31"N 95°42"E)-Banmauk Township, Sagaing Region
Thayetkon (24°20"N 95°19"E) -Banmauk Township, Sagaing Region